The Tommy Flanagan Tokyo Recital is an album by jazz pianist Tommy Flanagan. It is a trio album, recorded in 1975, with bassist Keter Betts and drummer Bobby Durham.

Background and recording
This album was recorded on February 15, 1975, after Flanagan had been vocalist Ella Fitzgerald's pianist for seven consecutive years. It was his first album release as leader since 1960.

Music
The trio play compositions by Duke Ellington and Billy Strayhorn.

Track listing
"All Day Long" (Billy Strayhorn) – 5:12 	
"U.M.M.G." (Strayhorn) – 4:42 	
"Something to Live For" (Duke Ellington, Strayhorn) – 3:04 	
"Main Stem" (Ellington) – 6:55 	
"Day Dream" (Ellington, John Latouche, Strayhorn) – 4:40 	
"The Intimacy of the Blues" (Strayhorn) – 6:10 	
"Caravan" (Ellington, Irving Mills, Juan Tizol) – 6:46 	
"Chelsea Bridge" (Strayhorn) – 6:17
"Take the 'A' Train" (Strayhorn) – 5:17

Personnel
Tommy Flanagan – piano
Keter Betts – bass
Bobby Durham – drums

References

1975 albums
Tommy Flanagan albums
Albums produced by Norman Granz
Pablo Records albums